Madan Maharaj FC is an Indian professional football club based in Bhopal, Madhya Pradesh. It is also first professional football club from the state. They currently compete in Madhya Pradesh Premier League and were part of 2021 I-League Qualifiers.

History

Formation and journey 
The club was founded in 1992. They participated in the 24th Bodofa Upen Brahma All India Gold Cup football tournament and reached the semi-finals.

Present years 
In 2018, Madan Maharaj FC was keen to participate in the 2nd Division and was nominated by Madhya Pradesh Football Association, but couldn't participate in the league. Madan Maharaj became champions of Madhya Pradesh Premier League onaugural season in 2021, by defeating Lions Club FC of Jabalpur in the final match, by a margin of 2–0. They scored first goal in 34th minute and increased the lead in 88th minute. In July, the club was nominated for 2021–22 I-League 2nd division or 2021 I-League Qualifiers, by Madhya Pradesh Football Association. In August, the teams for the qualifiers were announced, and the club secured a spot in it.

Stadium 
Madam Maharaj played their MP Premier League matches at Barkatullah Khan University's ground in Bhopal. They also play some home matches at Tatya Tope Nagar Sports Complex.

Ownership 
MMFC is owned by Madan Maharaj College, a private college in Bhopal.

Kit manufacturers and shirt sponsors

Players

Current squad

Personnel

Honours

League 
I-League 2nd Division
Fourth place (1): 2021
Madhya Pradesh Premier League
Champions (1): 2021

Cup 
State Gold Cup (Madhya Pradesh)
Champions (1): 2018

Youth section
Madan Maharaj has its youth men's football team, while club's U17 team took part in the group stages of 2022–23 U-17 Youth Cup.

References

External links 

 Team profile at the-aiff.com
 Team info at Global Sports Archive

Football clubs in Madhya Pradesh
Association football clubs established in 1992
1992 establishments in India
I-League 2nd Division clubs